Gatton railway station is located on the Main line in Queensland, Australia. It serves the town of Gatton in the Lockyer Valley Region. The station has two side platforms, opening in 1866.

Services
Gatton is served by Queensland Rail Travel's twice weekly Westlander service travelling between Brisbane and Charleville.

Transport links
Laidley Bus Services operates one route via Gatton station:
539: Heildon to Rosewood station service

References

External links

Gatton station Queensland's Railways on the Internet

Gatton, Queensland
Railway stations in Australia opened in 1866
Railway stations in Lockyer Valley Region
Main Line railway, Queensland